Zelenokumsk is a town and the administrative center of Sovetsky District in Stavropol Krai, Russia, located on the Kuma River. Population:

History
It was founded in 1762 as the selo of Vorontsovo-Alexandrovskoye. It was granted work settlement status in 1963 and renamed Sovetskoye. It was given its present name when town status was granted to it in 1965.

Administrative and municipal status
Within the framework of administrative divisions, Zelenokumsk serves as the administrative center of Sovetsky District. As an administrative division, it is, together with six rural localities, incorporated within Sovetsky District as the Town of Zelenokumsk. As a municipal division, the Town of Zelenokumsk is incorporated within Sovetsky Municipal District as Zelenokumsk Urban Settlement.

References

Notes

Sources

External links

Official website of Zelenokumsk 
Zelenokumsk Business Directory 

Cities and towns in Stavropol Krai
Populated places established in 1762